The 2019 Hong Kong Sevens was a rugby sevens tournament that took place at the Hong Kong Stadium between the 5–7 April 2019. It was the 44th edition of the Hong Kong Sevens, and the seventh tournament of the 2018–19 World Rugby Sevens Series. Sixteen teams competed in the main tournament, while a further twelve competed in a qualifier tournament with the winner getting core team status for the 2019–20 World Rugby Sevens Series.

After securing three wins from three in their "pool of death", Fiji became the first team to win five consecutive Hong Kong titles after they defeated France 21–7. The United States came in third after losing to Fiji in the semi final before dispatching Samoa (who lost to France) in the third place playoff by 12 points. In the Challenge Trophy, Scotland defeated Japan by two points with Gavin Lowe scoring the match winning try for Scotland. This meant that after seven rounds of the series, the United States margin was dropped to only seven points from second place Fiji with New Zealand a fellow five points behind after they finished sixth in Hong Kong.

The World Series Qualifier tournament saw Ireland and Hong Kong make the final after they defeated Germany and Chile in the respective semi finals. In the final it was Ireland who got core status for the first time in the nation's history after they defeated Hong Kong 28–7 to be able to compete in all events as a core nation for the 2019–20 season.

Background
The 2019 Hong Kong Sevens is the seventh round of ten in the 2018–19 season and the 44th edition of the tournament since its inception in 1976. Heading into the round the United States was leading the series with 113 points from six rounds. This meant that they had a seven-point gap over second place New Zealand after finishing in fourth place in the previous round while New Zealand came in fifth. Behind them was Fiji and South Africa with both teams making the cup semis with South Africa taking out the title in Vancouver. Outside of the top four spots, England was on 80 points with Australia sixth with 65. On 13 March, news about the future of the series was announced with the Hong Kong Sevens being one of six combined rounds in the men's and women's series starting from the 2019–20 season with the other tournaments being Dubai, Cape Town, New Zealand, Sydney and Paris.

Teams 
Sixteen teams competed in the main tournament with the fifteen teams being core teams to the series. The sixteenth team in Portugal was invited by World Rugby to fill the remaining spot in the draw. A further twelve teams will compete in the World Series Qualifier tournament with the winner to replace the bottom ranked team after the end of the season. Ten teams will be returning from last year with only Russia and the Philippines not competing in the previous year.

Format
The teams were divided into pools of four teams, who played a round-robin within the pool. Points were awarded in each pool on the standard schedule for rugby sevens tournaments (though different from the standard in the 15-man game)—3 for a win, 2 for a draw, 1 for a loss. The main draw consists of sixteen teams with fifteen of them being core teams that compete in each series event, plus an invitational team (Portugal). These teams competed in Pools A, B, C, and D. The winners and runners-up from each pool in the main draw qualified for the Cup quarterfinals. The losers of these quarterfinals competed in the Challenge Trophy bracket. The qualifying tournament features twelve teams from the six regional championships. These teams play in Pool E, F and G. The top two teams from each pool, plus the top two third-place teams, advanced to the knockout stage. The winner of the qualifying event books a spot as a core team for the following World Series season (2019–20).

Summary

Day 1
The opening day of the tournament saw the first eight games of the pool stage. The United States who were predicted to be the favourites for the tournament got off to a good start by defeating Spain 36–7 in the opening match of Pool D with Stephen Tomasin scoring a double. England survived a scare in their match with Wales after being behind by 14 points at the half before coming back with Dan Norton breaking the all-time leading try scorer record. England would go on to win the match 36–19.

The New Zealand team paid tribute to the victims from the Christchurch massacre as they wore white instead of their traditional black as they knock off Australia 40–19. Fiji began their defence of the title as they defeated Kenya 22–5 in the other match of Pool C in what was a repeat of last year's final. The cup finalists from the previous round won their first games with France smashing Portugal 40–7 while South Africa was given an early scare in their 22–7 win over Japan. The other two games saw Samoa and Argentina record wins over their opposition.

Day 2
The second day of the tournament saw the remaining sixteen matches being played in the groups. The main action from the second day was in Pool D with the United States losing to Wales in the second match of the day despite a hat-trick from Carlin Isles. The United States would qualify through to the knockout stage after Spain defeated Wales by sixteen points to make it through by point differential. England was the second team that qualified as they defeated Spain 54–5 before knocking off the leaders in the final match of the pool. Fiji kept their defence alive after topping Pool C following a win over New Zealand in what was described as the "group of death". Earlier they defeated Australia 31–12 to eliminate the Australians from title contention. New Zealand finished in second place after they dispatch Kenya 36–0 to qualify through to the cup quarter-finals.

France finished top of Pool B after they came from seven points down in the match against Argentina to record a 26–14 which featured four different try scorers. Argentina would join them in the quarters after getting past Portugal in what was a tough match for Argentina. This was due to them being down by 14 points early in the second half before recovering to a 26–21 win with a Luciano Gonzalez try with only two minutes left on the clock. South Africa also remained perfect in the quest for their first Hong Kong title after they finished top of Pool A with a 21–7 over fellow qualifiers Samoa. For Scotland and Japan they were relegated to the challenge trophy after losing their second matches earlier in the pool.

Day 3
The third day of competition saw the tournament head to the knockout phase of the competition. The quarter finals saw an upset in the final quarter final match with France defeating New Zealand for the first time at the event. Manoel Dall'igna from the French team responded, "we played like a team, played very well together," in the 14–12 victory. Fiji received a massive shock in their quarter final match with the team going down 12–0 early in the first half. Two tries from Paula Dranisinukula brought Fiji back into the match as they levelled with their opponents at the half. The second half saw the Fijians taking the lead and ending up winners by five points. South Africa attempt to win their first Hong Kong Sevens ended with a loss against the United States while Samoa defeated England 14–12 after Dan Bibby had to be carried off the field in the first half.

In the semi finals, Fiji defeated the Americans by nine points in the first semi final to book a spot in their fifth consecutive Hong Kong final. Sevuloni Mocenacagi opened the scoring for Fiji in the second minute of play before Carlin Isles scored his first of two tries for the game to level the match. The Fijians scored tries either side of the half to give them the victory and a spot in the cup final. Their opponent in the final was France who made it to their second consecutive cup final for the season after dispatching Samoa in the other semi. The game which saw Samoa having to catch up after the French got the lead in the first minute from a Gabin Villière try. With the match see-sawing towards a result, a controversial try from Aurelien Callandret sealed the win for France despite replays showing the foot touching the line.

Vilimoni Botitu opened the scoring for Fiji with a try in the fourth minute to give Fiji the early lead in the final against France. Fiji extended their lead at the end of the first half with Aminiasi Tuimaba scoring the first of two tries in the match to give Fiji a fourteen-point lead at the break. A penalty try at the start of the second half gave France some hope. But Tuimaba got his second try of the match to give Fiji the win. This win saw Fiji became the first team to win five consecutive Hong Kong titles. In the third place play-off, the United States defeated Samoa 22–10 as they had four different try scorers in the twelve point victory.

In the World Series Qualifier, Ireland and Hong Kong met in the qualifier final to see who would qualify through to the World Series. This was after they had defeated Germany and Chile earlier in the day. Harry McNulty scored the first try in the third minute of play to give Ireland the lead. This was followed by tries from Greg O'Shea and Jordan Conroy at either end of the half time to give Ireland a 21-point advantage. From there they wouldn't lose the lead despite Hong Kong getting a try back to give some sniff of a victory and for Ireland they received core status.

Main draw

Pool stage
All times in Hong Kong Time (UTC+08:00).

Pool A

Pool B

Pool C

Pool D

Knockout stage

Thirteenth place

Challenge Trophy

5th place

Cup

Tournament placings

Source: World Rugby

Players

Scoring leaders

Source: World Rugby

Dream team
The following seven players were selected to the tournament dream team at the conclusion of the tournament:

World Series qualifier

Teams

Pool stage

All times in Hong Kong Time (UTC+08:00).

Pool E

Pool F

Pool G

Knockout stage

Overall record

See also
2019 Hong Kong Women's Sevens

References

External links
 Tournament page
 World Rugby page

2019
rugby union
2018–19 World Rugby Sevens Series
2019 in Asian rugby union
Hong Kong Sevens